Ben Sullivan (born March 19, 1984) is an American basketball coach and former player who is currently an assistant coach for the Boston Celtics of the National Basketball Association (NBA). He was previously an assistant coach with the Atlanta Hawks and the Milwaukee Bucks of the NBA. A former center at Cal State Northridge and the University of Portland, Sullivan has primarily served as a shooting coach during his NBA coaching career.

Coaching career 
Sullivan retired from playing basketball and joined his alma mater Portland as their director of basketball technology before becoming an assistant coach at Lewis & Clark College, during which he was also an office manager at a construction firm in Vancouver, Washington.

San Antonio Spurs 
Sullivan joined the San Antonio Spurs front office in 2012 as a video intern on the recommendation of then-Spurs assistant Ime Udoka. With the Spurs, he worked his way to a position in player development, where he was tasked with everything from scouting reports to analytics, as well as one-on-one workouts with players. He also worked under Spurs assistant Chip Engelland, considered to be one of the top shooting coaches in the NBA.

Atlanta Hawks 
Sullivan was named an assistant coach on former Spurs assistant Mike Budenholzer's coaching staff for the Atlanta Hawks on August 20, 2014.

Milwaukee Bucks 
Sullivan was one of a number of assistants who joined Budenholzer when the latter was hired as head coach of the Milwaukee Bucks before the 2018–19 NBA season. While in Milwaukee, Sullivan has worked with NBA Most Valuable Player Giannis Antetokounmpo in developing his shooting ability, which has been considered as the main weakness in the Bucks star's basketball game. Sullivan won his first NBA championship when the Bucks defeated the Phoenix Suns four games to two in the 2021 NBA Finals.

Boston Celtics
Before the 2021–22 NBA season, Sullivan was hired as an assistant coach by the Boston Celtics

References

External links 
 Portland Pilots player profile
 Portland Pilots coach profile

1984 births
Living people
Sportspeople from Boston
Sportspeople from Portland, Oregon
Sportspeople from Lake Oswego, Oregon
Basketball players from Boston
Basketball players from Portland, Oregon
Basketball coaches from Massachusetts
Basketball coaches from Oregon
Centers (basketball)
Cal State Northridge Matadors men's basketball players
Portland Pilots men's basketball players
USC Heidelberg players
Portland Pilots men's basketball coaches
Lewis & Clark Pioneers men's basketball coaches
Atlanta Hawks assistant coaches
Milwaukee Bucks assistant coaches